Blagoja Georgievski (15 October 1950 – 29 January 2020) was a Macedonian professional basketball player and coach. He represented the Yugoslavia national basketball team internationally.

National team career 
Georgievski competed for SFR Yugoslavia in the 1972 Summer Olympics and in the 1976 Summer Olympics.

References

1950 births
2020 deaths
Basketball players at the 1972 Summer Olympics
Basketball players at the 1976 Summer Olympics
Competitors at the 1971 Mediterranean Games
KK Jagodina coaches
Macedonian basketball coaches
Macedonian expatriate basketball people in Serbia
Macedonian men's basketball players
Olympic basketball players of Yugoslavia
Olympic medalists in basketball
Olympic silver medalists for Yugoslavia
Medalists at the 1976 Summer Olympics
Mediterranean Games gold medalists for Yugoslavia
Mediterranean Games medalists in basketball
Point guards
Road incident deaths in North Macedonia
Sportspeople from Skopje
Yugoslav basketball players